The Back Trail is a 1924 American silent Western film directed by George Marshall and Clifford Smith and starring Jack Hoxie, Eugenia Gilbert and Al Hoxie.

Cast
 Jack Hoxie as Jeff Prouty
 Al Hoxie as The Tramp 
 Eugenia Gilbert as Ardis Andrews
 Claude Payton as Gentleman Harry King
 William Berke as Jim Lawton 
 William McCall as Judge Jefferson Talent
 Buck Connors as Shorty
 Pat Harmon as Curry

References

Bibliography
 Langman, Larry. A Guide to Silent Westerns. Greenwood Publishing Group, 1992.

External links
 

1924 films
1924 Western (genre) films
American black-and-white films
Films directed by George Marshall
Films directed by Clifford Smith
Universal Pictures films
Silent American Western (genre) films
1920s English-language films
1920s American films